The Algernon Sydney Sullivan Award is an award presented to graduating seniors, alumni, and faculty of selected colleges and universities in the Southern United States for excellence of character and service to humanity.

The awards stem from the Society's wish to establish a permanent reminder of the "noblest human qualities as expressed and followed in the life of its first president, Algernon Sydney Sullivan; and to do so in a manner which will perpetuate the influence of such a man, not so much as an individual but as a type." Specifically, each awarding institution seeks recipients with Sullivan's ideals of heart, mind, and conduct as evidenced by a spirit of love for and helpfulness to others, who "excel in high ideals of living, in fine spiritual qualities, and in generous and unselfish service to others. When the institution makes the Student Award, it appoints the recipient as its representative to bear its standard before the world." 

The Award consists of a copper medallion, an engraved certificate, and the biography of Algernon Sydney Sullivan. Recipients were chosen yearly from the graduation class of each institution, which also had the privilege of honoring one non-student conspicuously helpful to and associated with the institution in its effort to encourage and preserve a high standard of character.

The award was first given by the New York Southern Society in honor of prominent New York lawyer, Algernon Sydney Sullivan, at Peabody College in Nashville, now part of Vanderbilt University. That success led to the establishment of the Award in other institutions, and for the disposition of the fund provided for that purpose.

By 1934, the Algernon Sydney Sullivan Award was being presented to deserving individuals at thirteen colleges throughout the South.  In 1936, the Algernon Sydney Sullivan Foundation began distributing scholarships at four of those institutions.

Notable recipients
Cynthia Bathurst, animal rights activist
Hester A. Davis, Arkansas State Archaeologist
Robert Gates, U.S. Secretary of Defense
Betty Jane Gorin-Smith, Kentucky historian
Wil Lou Gray, South Carolina innovator in alternative education
Lewis Craig Humphrey, Kentucky newspaper editor
John McCardell Jr., historian and academic administrator
Lewis F. Powell Jr., Associate Justice of the Supreme Court of the United States
Paul Goodloe McIntire,  Investment banker
Matthew Gordon Lanetti, Citadel Regimental Academic Officer
 Sarah A. Imam M.D., Assistant Professor, Department of Health and Human Performance, The Citadel, South Carolina
 Jaret Sean Price, Company Commander within The Citadel’s South Carolina Corps of Cadets 
William C. Hubbard, Dean of the University of South Carolina School of Law and Former American Bar Association President
Kitty O'Brien Joyner, first female engineer at NASA
Doug Hicks, 19th President, Davidson College
Katie Britt, United States Senator

References

American education awards
Awards established in 1925
Humanitarian and service awards
Southern United States